Mario Sonnleitner (born 8 October 1986) is an Austrian professional footballer who plays for TSV Hartberg.

Career

Grazer AK
Sonnleitner started at Grazer AK on 1 July 2004 and stayed there for 3 years, before moving up the road to Sturm Graz on the 21 June 2007.

Sturm Graz
Signed on a free transfer he has been at Sturm Graz until 2010 before moving to Rapid Wien.

International career
He has represented Austria at U21 level.

Honors
 Austrian Cup : 2009-10

References

1986 births
Living people
Austrian footballers
Austrian Football Bundesliga players
Grazer AK players
SK Sturm Graz players
Kapfenberger SV players
SK Rapid Wien players
TSV Hartberg players

Association football defenders